Hanno may refer to:

People 
 Hanno (given name)

 Hanunu (8th century BC), Philistine king previously rendered by scholars as "Hanno"
 Hanno the Navigator, Carthaginian explorer
 Hanno the Elder (died 204 BC), Carthaginian general
Hanno I the Great (4th century BC), Carthaginian politician and military leader
Hanno II the Great (3rd century BC), wealthy Carthaginian aristocrat
Hanno III the Great (2nd century BC), Carthaginian politician
Hanno, son of Hannibal, Carthaginian general in the First Punic War
Hanno, Messana garrison commander, Carthaginian general in The First Punic War
Hanno, son of Bomilcar, Carthaginian officer in the Second Punic War

 Dennis M. Hanno, U.S. college president
 Carl von Hanno (1901–1953), Norwegian painter
 Lillemor von Hanno (1900–1984), Norwegian actress, novelist and playwright
 Wilhelm von Hanno (1826–1882), German-born Norwegian architect, sculptor and painter

Fictional characters
 Hanno, a Carthaginian character in the play Poenulus by the Roman playwright Plautus
 Hanno, fictional character in The Boat of a Million Years, an immortal Phoenician living to our times and beyond
 Hanno Tauber, often called Noah, is a character in the TV series Dark

Other uses
 Hannō, Saitama, Honshū, Japan
 Hanno (crater), a lunar crater
 Hanno (elephant), the pet white elephant of Pope Leo X
 G-AAUD Hanno, a named Handley Page H.P.42 airliner

See also
 Hanna (disambiguation)
 Hanni (disambiguation)
 Hannu (given name)
 Hano (disambiguation)